Events in 1985 in Japanese television.

Debuts

Ongoing
Music Fair, music (1964–present)
Mito Kōmon, jidaigeki (1969-2011)
Sazae-san, anime (1969–present)
Ōoka Echizen, jidaigeki (1970-1999)
FNS Music Festival, music (1974-present)
Panel Quiz Attack 25, game show (1975–present)
Doraemon, anime (1979-2005)
Dr. Slump - Arale-chan, anime (1981-1986)
Urusei Yatsura, anime (1981-1986)

Endings

See also
1985 in anime
List of Japanese television dramas
1985 in Japan
List of Japanese films of 1985

References